In Greek mythology, Leucothea, sometimes also called Leucothoe, was one of the aspects under which an ancient sea goddess was recognized, in this case as a transformed nymph.

Mythology 
In the more familiar variant, Ino, the daughter of Cadmus, sister of Semele, and queen of Athamas, became a goddess  after Hera drove her insane as a punishment for caring for the newborn Dionysus. She leapt into the sea with her son Melicertes in her arms, and out of pity, the Hellenes asserted, the Olympian gods turned them both into sea-gods, transforming Melicertes into Palaemon, the patron of the Isthmian Games, and Ino into Leucothea.

She has a sanctuary in Laconia, where she answers people's questions about dreams, her form of oracle.

In the version sited at Rhodes, a much earlier mythic level is reflected in the genealogy: There, a nymph or goddess named Halia ("salty") plunged into the sea and became Leucothea. Her parents were the titans Thalassa and Pontus (or Uranus). She was a local nymph and one of the aboriginal Telchines of the island. Halia became Poseidon's wife and bore him Rhodos and six sons; their sons were maddened by Aphrodite in retaliation for an inhospitable affront, assaulted their own mother Halia, and were confined in caves beneath the island by their father Poseidon; Halia cast herself into the sea, and became Leucothea. The people of Rhodes traced their mythic descent from the nymph Rhodos and the Sun god Helios.

In the Odyssey, Leucothea makes a dramatic appearance and tells the shipwrecked Odysseus to discard his cloak and raft, and offers him a veil to wind round himself, to save his life and reach land. Homer makes Leucothea the transfiguration of Ino.

It is possible that Leucothea is the "Leucothoe" that Hyginus makes the mother of Thersanon by Helios, although he could be referring to another woman by the same name.

Cultural allusions
 Leucothea is mentioned by John Milton in the Paradise Lost scene where archangel Michael descends to Adam and Eve to declare that they must no longer abide in Paradise (second edition, 1674, book XI, lines 133–135):
 Leucothea is mentioned by Robert Graves in The White Goddess.
 In Ezra Pound's Cantos, she is one of the goddess figures who comes to the poet's aid in Section: Rock-Drill (Cantos 85–95). She is introduced in Canto 91 as "Cadmus's daughter":
 She returns in Cantos 93 ("Κάδμου θυγάτηρ") and 95 ("Κάδμου θυγάτηρ/ bringing light per diafana/ λευκὁς Λευκόθοε/ white foam, a sea-gull… 'My bikini is worth yr/ raft'. Said Leucothae… Then Leucothea had pity,/'mortal once/ Who now is a sea-god…'"), and reappears at the beginning of Canto 96, the first of the Thrones section ("Κρήδεμνον…/ κρήδεμνον…/ and the wave concealed her,/ dark mass of great water.").
 Leucothea appears twice in Dialoghi con Leucò (Dialogues with Leucò) by Cesare Pavese.
 Leucothoé was the first work by the Irish playwright Isaac Bickerstaffe published in 1756.
 Leucothea becomes a metaphor, in Marcel Proust's In the Shadow of Young Girls in Flower, for the mist that covers a young man's gaze when looking on the beauty of young women: "…a cloud that had re-formed a few days later, once I had met them, muting the glow of their loveliness, often passing between them and my eyes, which saw them now dimmed, as through a gentle haze, reminiscent of Virgil's Leucothea."
 Leukothea is a poem by Keith Douglas.

Namesake 
35 Leukothea

Notes

References

General references 

 Cooper, J.C., ed. (1997). Brewer's Book of Myth and Legend. Oxford: Helicon Publishing Ltd.

Metamorphoses in Greek mythology
Characters in the Odyssey
Greek sea goddesses
Metamorphoses characters
Sea and river goddesses
Women of Helios
Rhodian mythology
Boeotian mythology
Corinthian mythology